Danta Ramgarh is a census town and a tehsil  tehsil of Sikar district in the Indian state of Rajasthan. Ex vice president of India Bhairon Singh Shekhawat, was born in village Khachariyaws close by to east of Ramgarh. Dantaramgarh tehsil is the largest tehsil in Sikar district and its population is above 300,000. This village is famous for its strategic fort built by Guman Singh Ladkhani in the year 1744. The topography of the surroundings from the top of the fort is breaths taking. Baba Balinath was a very popular saint about 400 years back. He is regarded as a village deity in the area..

Demographics 
As per 2011 census of India, population of Ramgarh, a census town, was 7,924 of which 4,034 were males and 3,890 were females.

Location 
Dantaramgarh town is 51km away from Sikar and 90 km away from Jaipur. Nearby railway station is Renwal railway station and the nearest airport is in Jaipur. Near by temples are Khatu Shyamji and Jeenmataji.

Current MLA of Dantaramgarh is Virendra Singh Choudhary from Congress Party.

See also 
 Danta

References 

Cities and towns in Sikar district